Spinibarbus is a genus of cyprinid fish found in eastern Asia.  There are currently seven described species in this genus.

Species
 Spinibarbus babeensis V. H. Nguyễn, 2001
 Spinibarbus denticulatus (Ōshima, 1926)
 Spinibarbus hollandi Ōshima, 1919
 Spinibarbus maensis H. D. Nguyễn, Q. N. Dương & Đ. H. Trần, 2007
 Spinibarbus nammauensis V. H. Nguyễn & Nguyen, 2001
 Spinibarbus ovalius V. H. Nguyễn & S. V. Ngô, 2001
 Spinibarbus sinensis (Bleeker, 1871)

References
 

 
Cyprinidae genera
Cyprinid fish of Asia